Events in the history of Castel Goffredo, in Italy.

Ancient age 

The territory of Castel Goffredo has been inhabited since the Bronze Age. The area was therefore affected by both Etruscan civilization, as evidenced by the discovery of some everyday utensils such as cups and jugs for water, which from Roman civilization starting from 1st century, with the discovery of some votive altar and of a sepulchral tombstone. This area was affected by the centuriation of Mantua and on the romanization of the historical center some scholars suppose that this was divided into twelve blocks and characterized by cardo and Decumanus Maximus and that at the intersection of "cardo maximum" and "decumanus maximus" were placed the forum, today represented by Mazzini Square.

Medieval age 
The first mention of Castellum Vifredi as an urban agglomeration is from 8 July 1107. Between 800 and 1115 Castel Goffredo belonged to county of Brescia up to 1190.

Later the city gave the status of free commune and when Brescia was not able to offer its defense, in 1337 preferred to place itself under the protection of Mantua and Gonzaga.

After alternate dominations of the Visconti (1337), of the Gonzagas (from 1337 to 1348), again of the Visconti (from 1348 to 1404), of Malatesta (from 1404 to 1426), of the Republic of Venice (from 1426 to 1431 and again from 1439 to 1441) and finally of the Gonzagas (from 1441), in 1466 with Alessandro Gonzaga the village became an imperial fief autonomous and he saw the birth of Marquess of Castel Goffredo. During his term the village was enlarged, the second city walls was erected and the "Alessandrini Statutes" were issued, which bears his name and remained in force until 1796.

Modern age 

With the marquis Aloisio Gonzaga in 1511 began the cadet branch of "Gonzaga of Castel Goffredo" and Castel Goffredo became capital of the small state. In his palace of residence (Gonzaga-Acerbi Palace) he created a magnificent court, frequented by poets (Matteo Bandello, Lucrezia Gonzaga and Pietro Aretino), artists, diplomats (Cesare Fregoso) and ambassadors (Antonio Rincon). In 1516 passed through Castel Goffredo the emperor Maximilian I of Habsburg while he pursued the French troops, and another emperor, Charles V, he was a guest of Aloisio Gonzaga on June 28, 1543 and obtained the keys to the citadel. The marquis perhaps commissioned the school of Giulio Romano to fresco his domus: remain in the loggia of the palace important pictorial evidence of that period. Aloisio Gonzaga died on July 19, 1549 and his was a troubled succession.
He was first succeeded by the eldest son Alfonso Gonzaga, who ruled the city from 1549 to 1592, when he died assassinated, for hereditary reasons, to Corte Gambaredolo by the hand of the nephew's assassins Rodolfo Gonzaga, brother of Aloysius Gonzaga. Rodolfo took possession of the fortress and ruled Castel Goffredo in terror. The castellan people did not accept the abuses and organized a conspiracy that led to the  assassination of the marquis on January 3, 1593, while going to the religious services in the St. Erasmus church. With his death, without male sons, the history of the locality as an autonomous Gonzaga fief and the short lordship of the "Gonzaga di Castel Goffredo" also ended.

After a long dispute at the imperial court of Rudolf II, Holy Roman Emperor between the third marquis of Castiglione Francesco Gonzaga (1577-1616) and the duke of Mantua Vincenzo I Gonzaga, in which he intervened in 1602 as ambassador, without result, Lorenzo da Brindisi, the city was definitively aggregated by imperial decree in 1603 to Duchy of Mantua and it followed its destiny until 1707 when the last of the Gonzagas, the duke Ferdinando Carlo Gonzaga, was deposed by the emperor Joseph I of Habsburg and forced into exile.

The Austrian domination determined the occupation of the city and the requisition of the warehouses of supplies and between the 1705 and 1706 Austrian soldiers sacked Castel Goffredo, taking hostage also some inhabitants.
In 1796 Napoleon Bonaparte pushed the Austrians beyond Mincio and in 1797 Austria ceded Lombardy to the French. On May 13 of that year, Castel Goffredo was occupied by French troops.

Contemporary age 

The Austrian governments followed in 1799, French from 1801 to 1814 and again Austrians until 1866.

In the years of 1848 Castel Goffredo was the anti-Austrian conspiratorial center of the Upper Mantovano and counted the presence of numerous patriots, led by the Castellano Giovanni Acerbi, who later became the intendant of Expedition of the Thousand of Garibaldi. The conspiracy was discovered and resulted in the tragic page of Belfiore martyrs.

In 1859, after the Battle of Solferino and San Martino which also involved the territory of Castel Goffredo being here deployed the 3rd corps of the general François Certain de Canrobert, the city was aggregated to Kingdom of Sardinia and in 1861 became part of Kingdom of Italy. In 1871 was founded "Società di Mutuo Soccorso" which in 1900 counted three hundred members.

1925 marked the economic and industrial turnaround of Castel Goffredo: in fact, he opened the first sock factory, the NO.E.MI., destined to write the history of the industrialization of the area.
On 19 September 1926 Castel Goffredo was devastated by the assassination by the fascists of the catholic master Anselmo Cessi.

After the second world war Castel Goffredo had a great economic development, becoming an industrial center of primary importance for the textile industry, thanks to the consistent production of socks for women, pantyhose and yarns.

He acquired the title of city in 2002.

Notes

Bibliography

In italian 
 
 
 

Castel Goffredo
Castel Goffredo